Sir Peregrine Charles Hugo Simon  (born 20 June 1950), is a retired Lord Justice of Appeal.

Education and career
He was educated at Westminster School and Trinity Hall, Cambridge. He was called to the Bar, Middle Temple in 1973. He was appointed as Queen's Counsel in 1991; as a Bencher in 1999 and Recorder in 1998. He was knighted in 2002 on his appointment as a High Court judge. He was appointed to the Court of Appeal in 2015 and upon this appointment he was sworn in as a member of Her Majesty's Most Honourable Privy Council. This gave him the Honorific Title "The Right Honourable" for Life. He retired on 21 June 2020.

Family
He is one of the three sons of Jocelyn Simon, Baron Simon of Glaisdale and his second wife, the former Fay Pearson.

Notable cases
 Barrow v Bankside Members Agency Ltd and another 
 National Boat Shows (NBS) v Earls Court
R v Incedal and Rarmoul-Bouhadjar
FHR European Ventures LLP v Cedar Capital Partners LLC

References

1950 births
Living people
Alumni of Trinity Hall, Cambridge
British barristers
21st-century English judges
Knights Bachelor
People educated at Westminster School, London
Members of the Privy Council of the United Kingdom
Place of birth missing (living people)
Sons of life peers
Lords Justices of Appeal
English King's Counsel